This is a list of transactions that have taken place during the off-season and the 2022–23 PBA season.

List of transactions

Retirement

Coaching changes

In-season

Player movements

Trades

Free agency

Signings

3x3

2022 PBA draft

The PBA Season 47 draft was held on May 15, 2022, at Robinsons Place Manila in Manila. A total of 52 amateur players were selected in six rounds of draft.

Notes

References

transactions
transactions, 2022-23